Kristina Klebe (born  1979–1982) is an American actress, director, producer and writer who came to prominence for her portrayal of Lynda Van Der Klok in Rob Zombie's Halloween (2007). Her other film roles include Proxy (2013), Neil Marshall's Hellboy (2019), and Two Witches (2021), the last of which she also co-wrote.

Early life
Klebe was born in New York City to European immigrant parents. Her father is from Germany. Klebe was raised primarily in New York City but spent time in Europe with her family in Germany, France and Italy as a child and teenager. She lived in Aix-en-Provence when she was 15 for six months as an exchange student, and in Paris when she was 18 working as an intern at the film distribution firm M5.

Klebe went to high school in New York City and graduated from Dartmouth College cum laude with a major in politics and a minor in theater and film. While in college, Klebe lived in Sienna, Italy when she was 20 for a study abroad program.

She gave up being a competitive equestrian for a more complete immersion in theater in her teens. She attended the National Theater Institute at the Eugene O'Neill Theater Center in Waterford, Connecticut.

Career
Her acting career began on several off-Broadway stages. Ranging from characters such as Juliet in "Romeo & Juliet," Beatrice in "The Servant of Two Masters," Dorimene in "The Bourgeois Gentleman," Mary in "On The Verge," and Jill in "The Big Funk," she has worked at Soho Rep, The Public Theater, NY Theater Workshop, 59E59, The Jean Cocteau Repertory and the Underwood Theater in New York.

Klebe was cast as Lynda Van Der Klok in Rob Zombie's Halloween (2007). She subsequently co-starred in the independent horror film Proxy (2013), and in the anthology film Tales of Halloween (2015).

In the mid-2010s, Klebe enrolled in the New York University Graduate Film Program at Tisch School of the Arts, where she wrote, directed, and acted in the short film Daddy's Little Girl as her thesis project, which was released in 2019.

She portrayed the historical character Leni Riefenstahl in Neil Marshall's remake of Hellboy (2019). Klebe had a leading role in the 2021 horror film Two Witches, which she co-wrote with director Pierre Tsigaridis.

Filmography

Film

Television

Video games

Notes

References

External links

21st-century American actresses
Actresses from New York City
American film actresses
American people of German descent
American television actresses
Dartmouth College alumni
German film actresses
German television actresses
Living people
Tisch School of the Arts alumni
Year of birth missing (living people)